John Tyler Caldwell (December 19, 1911 – October 13, 1995) was an American educator who presided over three universities, including North Carolina State University.

Early life
John Tyler Caldwell was born on December 19, 1911 in Yazoo City, Mississippi. He received a B.S. from Mississippi State College in 1932, an M.A. from Duke University in 1936, and a Ph.D. in political science from Princeton University in 1939 as a Julius Rosenwald Fellow.

Career
He was a professor of political science at Holmes Junior College from 1932–1936 and was a professor at Vanderbilt University from 1939-1947. Meanwhile, Caldwell also entered the US Navy as an Ensign in 1942 to serve in World War II and was awarded a Bronze Star for his service in the Battle of Okinawa. He left the Navy in 1946 as a Lieutenant Commander.

Caldwell was named president of the University of Montevallo in Alabama in 1947. After leaving Montevallo in 1951, he served as president of the University of Arkansas. Here, he supervised the development and expansion of the University's Graduate school and saw the beginning of the process of racial integration.

In 1959, Caldwell was named the eighth chancellor of North Carolina State University. During his tenure, the university established the School of Physical Sciences and Applied Mathematics and the School of Liberal Arts. After his retirement from the office in 1975 Caldwell continued to teach in the Department of Political Science.

Caldwell was an Eagle Scout, recipient of the Distinguished Eagle Scout Award, and worked with Scouting much of his life.

Death and legacy
Caldwell died in Raleigh, North Carolina at the age of 83. The NC State Alumni Association established the John T. Caldwell Alumni Scholarship Program (later called the Caldwell Fellows) in 1977 to recruit outstanding high school seniors to NC State.

NCSU Libraries Special Collections Research Center serves as the repository for John Tyler Caldwell's manuscript papers and University Archives.  Caldwell Hall at NCSU was also named after him.  Additionally, the North Carolina Humanities Council named its highest honor after Caldwell.

References

 
 Simpson, Ethel C. Image and Reflection: A Pictorial History of the University of Arkansas. Fayetteville: University of Arkansas Press, 1990.

External links 
 Guide to the John Tyler Caldwell Papers 1893-1996
 

1911 births
1995 deaths
People from Yazoo City, Mississippi
Duke University alumni
Princeton University alumni
Vanderbilt University faculty
United States Navy personnel of World War II
Chancellors of North Carolina State University
Leaders of the University of Arkansas
United States Navy officers